Gustine Independent School District is a public school district based in Gustine, Texas, United States.

The district has three schools that serve students in  prekindergarten through grade 12.

Academic achievement
In 2009, the school district was rated "academically acceptable" by the Texas Education Agency.

Special programs

Athletics
Gustine High School plays six-man football.

See also

List of school districts in Texas

References

External links
Gustine ISD

School districts in Comanche County, Texas